The Outsider may refer to:

Film
 The Outsider (1917 film), an American film directed by William C. Dowlan
 The Outsider (1926 film), an American film directed by Rowland V. Lee
 The Outsider (1931 film), a film starring Joan Barry
 The Outsider (1939 film), a film starring George Sanders
 The Outsider (1948 film) or The Guinea Pig, a British film starring Richard Attenborough
 The Outsider (1961 film), a film directed by Delbert Mann and starring Tony Curtis
 The Outsider, a TV film and series pilot starring Darren McGavin; became a series in the 1968–69 season
 The Outsider (1979 film), a film starring Craig Wasson
 The Outsider (Le marginal), a film starring Jean-Paul Belmondo
 The Outsider (1998 film) or Gangster World, a science fiction TV movie 
 The Outsider (2002 film), a western starring Tim Daly and Naomi Watts
 The Outsider (2005 film), a 2005 documentary directed by Nicholas Jarecki, featuring Bijou Phillips and others
 The Outsider (2014 film), an action crime film starring Craig Fairbrass, James Caan and Shannon Elizabeth
 The Outsider (2018 film), an action crime film starring Jared Leto
 The Outsider (2019 film), a western starring Jon Foo and Trace Adkins

Literature
 The Outsider (Camus novel) or The Stranger (L'Étranger), a 1942 novel by Albert Camus
 The Outsider (Colin Wilson), a 1956 book by Colin Wilson
 The Outsider (King novel), a 2018 novel by Stephen King
 "The Outsider" (short story), a 1926 short story by H. P. Lovecraft
 The Outsider (Wright novel), a 1953 novel by Richard Wright
 The Outsider and Others (1939), the first major collection of stories by Lovecraft
 The Outsider, a 1961 novel by Monica Edwards
 The Outsider, a 1984 novel by Howard Fast
 The Outsider, a 1996 novel by Elizabeth Lambert (writing as Penelope Williamson), basis for the 2002 film
 "The outsider", a 1959 biographical essay about Iwo Jima flag-raiser Ira Hayes, by William Bradford Huie, basis for the 1961 film
 The Outsider, a character in the 1987 novel Watchers by Dean Koontz
 The Outsider (play), a play by Dorothy Brandon; basis for 1926, 1931, and 1939 films (see above) and other adaptations
 The Outsider (magazine), a 1960s literary magazine

Music
 The Outsider Festival, a Scottish music and comedy festival

Albums
 The Outsider (CL Smooth album), 2007
 The Outsider (DJ Shadow album), 2006

Songs
 "The Outsider" (song), a 2003 song by A Perfect Circle
 "The Outsider", by Black Country Communion from 2
 "The Outsider", by Black Veil Brides from Vale
 "The Outsider", by Blur, a b-side of "Crazy Beat"
 "The Outsider", by Ian Hunter from You're Never Alone with a Schizophrenic
 "The Outsider", by Marina and the Diamonds from The Family Jewels
 "The Outsider", by Uriah Heep from Outsider

Television

Series
 The Outsider (1968 TV series), a US series starring Darren McGavin
 The Outsider (1983 TV series), a UK series starring John Duttine
 The Outsider (miniseries), a 2020 series based on the Stephen King novel

Episodes
 "The Outsider" (The O.C.)
 "The Outsider" (Once Upon a Time)
 "The Outsider" (Rubicon)
 "The Outsider" (The Dead Zone)
 "The Outsider", an episode of The Zula Patrol

Video games
 The Outsider (video game), a canceled action-adventure game
 The Outsider (Dishonored), a character in the Dishonored video game franchise

See also
 Outsider (disambiguation)
 The Outsiders (disambiguation)